Wandjuk Djuwakan Marika OBE (1927 or 1930 – 16 June 1987), was an Aboriginal Australian painter, actor, composer and Indigenous land rights activist. He was a member of the Rirratjingu clan of the Yolngu people of north-east Arnhem Land in the Northern Territory of Australia, and the son of Mawalan 1 Marika.

Early life
Wandjuk Djuakan Marika was born in 1927 (or 1930) on Bremer Island (Dhambaliya) in the Northern Territory. He was the eldest son of Mawalan 1 Marika and his wife Bamatja, and the brother of Banduk Marika, Dhuwarrwarr Marika, Bayngul, and Laklak (all sisters). He was a member of the Rirratjingu group of the Yolngu people.

Marika was educated at the Methodist Overseas Mission at Yirrkala.

Career 
His paintings expressed his people's traditional lore and spiritual beliefs, and included Djang'kawu Story (1960) and Birth of the Djang'kawu Children of Yelangbara (1982). Djang'kawu is the founding ancestor of the Rirratjingu in traditional stories, who gave birth to the clan at Yalangbara. He also painted the story of the Wawilak sisters. The expression of these stories was part of his responsibility as a clan leader, and the skills were passed on by his father, Mawalan 1.

In a 1959 painting, Sea life (Dreaming of the artist’s mother), 1959, Marika expresses elements of his mother’s Warramirri clan. He was so distressed by the reproduction of the Djang’kawu story on a tea towel in 1959 that he stopped painting for years.

As he had been taught English at the mission school, he used his skills to assist anthropologists such as Charles Mountford and Ronald and Catherine Berndt to understand Yolngu culture.

He co-founded the Aboriginal Arts Board in 1973, and became chairman in 1976, a post he held until 1979.

As an actor, Marika appeared in the films Where the Green Ants Dream (1984) and Initiation (1987). He also appeared in the television miniseries Women of the Sun. He was both actor and composer in Where the Green Ants Dream.

He was the author of The Aboriginal Children's History of Australia.

Activism 
Marika wrote frequent but unsuccessful letters to the Australian federal government to protest against mining activities on Yolngu lands. In August 1963 he helped to send the first of several bark petitions to the Commonwealth government protesting the decision to grant mining leases on the Gove Peninsula. The Yirrkala bark petition was the first Indigenous document to be officially recognised and accepted by the Australian Parliament.

Marika lobbied for the creation of the Aboriginal Artists Agency in 1973 to protect the copyright of Aboriginal artists and Indigenous intellectual property.

Recognition and honours

In 1979 he was appointed an Officer of the Order of the British Empire in the Queen's Birthday Honours list.

A photographic portrait of Marika by Juno Gemes (1979) hangs in the National Portrait Gallery in Canberra, and several of his paintings feature in the Art Gallery of New South Wales.

His name was given to the Wandjuk Marika 3D Memorial Award, a category of the prestigious National Aboriginal & Torres Strait Islander Art Award, awarded annually by the Museum and Art Gallery of the Northern Territory.

Personal life and death
His son Mawalan 2 Marika is also an artist, and his daughter is Rarriwuy Marika. Wandjuk Marika was the uncle of Raymattja Marika.

Marika died on 16 June 1987.

See also
Roy Dadaynga Marika (c.1925– 1993)

References

Further reading
 Isaacs, Jennifer (1995). Wandjuk Marika: Life Story. University of Queensland Press, 
 Lists publications credited to Marika, including stories told by him to others. 
 Short bios of: Mawalan Marika 1 (c. 1908–1967), Mathaman Marika (c. 1920–1970), Milirrpum Marika (c. 1923–1983), Roy Dadaynga Marika MBE (c. 1925–1993), Wandjuk Djuwakan Marika OBE (1929–1987), Banduk Marika (born 1954), Dhuwarrwarr Marika (born c.1946), Wanyubi Marika (born 1967), Yalmay Gurrwun (Marika) Yunupingu (born 1956), Mawalan Marika 2 (born 1957), Jimmy Barrmula Yunupingu (born 1963) (son of Dhuwarrwarr Marika).
 Photo of Wandjuk with his father and four uncles.

External links 
 Wandjuk Marika at the Art Gallery of New South Wales

1927 births
1987 deaths
People from the Northern Territory
Indigenous Australian actors
Australian Officers of the Order of the British Empire
20th-century Australian painters